The 2019 CS Nebelhorn Trophy was held in September 2019 in Oberstdorf, Germany. It was part of the 2019–20 ISU Challenger Series. Medals were awarded in the disciplines of men's singles, ladies' singles, pair skating, and ice dance.

Entries 
The International Skating Union published the list of entries on August 27, 2019.

Changes to preliminary assignments

Results

Men

Ladies

Pairs

Ice dance

References

CS Nebelhorn Trophy
Nebelhorn Trophy